William Smith Greenfield FRSE FRCPE LLD (1846-1919) was a British anatomist. He was an expert on anthrax.

Life

He was born in Salisbury, Wiltshire on 9 January 1846. He studied Medicine at the University of London graduating MB BS in 1872.
In 1878 he succeeded John Burdon-Sanderson as Professor of Pathology at the Brown Institute. In 1881 he went to Edinburgh to become Professor of Pathology and Clinical Medicine.

In 1884, he was living at 7 Heriot Row, a  magnificent Georgian terraced townhouse in Edinburgh's Second New Town.

In 1886, he was elected a Fellow of the Royal Society of Edinburgh. His proposers were Sir William Turner, James Cossar Ewart, Robert Gray and Peter Guthrie Tait.

In 1893, he gave the Bradshaw Lecture to the Royal College of Physicians.

He retired to  Elie in Fife in 1912, being succeeded by Prof James Lorrain Smith. He died in Juniper Green south of Edinburgh on 12 August 1919.

Family

Deeply evangelical, one of his sons became a minister, and two of his daughters became Christian missionaries in India. Sons, Thomas Challen Greenfield BSc, A.M.Inst CE, M. Inst W.E., Water Engineer; Godwin Greenfield, a noted Neuropathologist founding the British Neuropathological Society.

Artistic Recognition

His sketch portrait of 1884, by William Brassey Hole, is held by the Scottish National Portrait Gallery.

Publications
Health Primers (1879)
Pathology (1886)
Cirrhosis of the Liver in Cats (1888)

References

Fellows of the Royal Society of Edinburgh
British anatomists
Alumni of the University of London
Academics of the University of Edinburgh
1846 births
1919 deaths
People associated with Edinburgh
People from Salisbury